Firuzabad (also Romanized as Fīrūzābād) is a village in Chaleh Tarkhan Rural District of Qaleh Now District of Ray County, Tehran province, Iran. At the 2006 National Census, its population was 8,579 in 2,106 households, when it was in Qaleh Now Rural District in Kahrizak District. The following census in 2011 counted 8,699 people in 2,416 households. The latest census in 2016 showed a population of 8,756 people in 2,510 households; it was the largest village in its rural district.

References 

Ray County, Iran

Populated places in Tehran Province

Populated places in Ray County, Iran